Qaboos bin Said Al Said (18 November 1940 – 10 January 2020) was Sultan of Oman from 23 July 1970 until his death in 2020. A fifteenth-generation descendant of the founder of the House of Al Said,
 he was the longest-serving leader in the Middle East and Arab world at the time of his death, having ruled for almost half a century.

The only son of Said bin Taimur, Sultan of Muscat and Oman, Qaboos was educated in Suffolk, England. After graduating from the Royal Military Academy Sandhurst, he served briefly in the British Army. He returned to Oman in 1966 and was the subject of considerable restrictions from his father. In 1970, Qaboos ascended to the Omani throne after overthrowing his father in a coup d'état, with British support. The country was subsequently renamed the Sultanate of Oman.

As sultan, Qaboos implemented a policy of modernization and ended Oman's international isolation. His reign saw a rise in living standards and development in the country, the abolition of slavery, the end of the Dhofar Rebellion, and the promulgation of Oman's constitution. Suffering from poor health in later life, Qaboos died in 2020. He had no children, so he entailed the royal court to reach consensus on a successor upon his death. As a precaution he hid a letter which named his successor in case an agreement was not achieved. After his death the royal court decided to view Qaboos's letter and named his intended successor, his cousin Haitham bin Tariq, as sultan.

Early life and education

Sayyid Qaboos bin Said was born in the southern city of Salalah in Dhofar on 18 November 1940 as an only son of Sultan Said bin Taimur and Mazoon al-Mashani. He received his primary and secondary education at Salalah, and was sent to a private educational establishment at Bury St Edmunds in England at age 16. At 20, he entered the Royal Military Academy Sandhurst. After graduating from Sandhurst in September 1962, he joined the British Army and was posted to the 1st Battalion The Cameronians (Scottish Rifles), serving with them in Germany for one year. He also held a staff appointment with the British Army.

After his military service, Qaboos studied local government subjects in England and then completed his education with a world tour chaperoned by Leslie Chauncy.  Upon his return in 1966, he was placed under virtual house arrest in Al-Husun Palace in Salalah by his father. Here he was kept isolated from government affairs, except for occasional briefings by his father's personal advisers. Qaboos studied Islam and the history of his country. His personal relationships were limited to a handpicked group of palace officials who were sons of his father's advisors and a few expatriate friends such as Tim Landon. Sultan Said said that he would not allow his son to be involved with the developing planning process, and Qaboos began to make known his desire for change—which was quietly supported by his expatriate visitors.

Political career

Rise to power

Qaboos acceded to the throne on 23 July 1970 following a successful coup against his father, with the aim of ending the country's isolation and using its oil revenue for modernization and development. He declared that the country would no longer be known as Muscat and Oman, but would change its name to "the Sultanate of Oman" in order to better reflect its political unity.

The coup was supported by the British, with Ian Cobain writing that it was "planned in London by MI6 and by civil servants at the Ministry of Defence and the Foreign Office" and sanctioned by the Prime Minister, Harold Wilson.

The first pressing problem that Qaboos bin Said faced as sultan was an armed communist insurgency from South Yemen, the Dhofar Rebellion (1962–1976). The sultanate eventually defeated the incursion with help from the Shah of Iran, Jordanian troops sent from his friend King Hussein of Jordan, British Special Forces and the Royal Air Force.

Reign as Sultan
There were few rudiments of a modern state when Qaboos took power. Oman was a poorly developed country, severely lacking in infrastructure, healthcare, and education, with only six miles of paved roads and a population dependent on subsistence farming and fishing. Qaboos modernized the country using oil revenues. Schools and hospitals were built, and a modern infrastructure was laid down, with hundreds of kilometres of new roads paved, a telecommunications network established, projects for a port and airport that had begun prior to his reign were completed and a second port was built, and electrification was achieved. The government also began to search for new water resources and built a desalination plant, and the government encouraged the growth of the private enterprise, especially in development projects. Banks, hotels, insurance companies, and print media began to appear as the country developed economically. The Omani riyal was established as the national currency, replacing the Indian rupee and Maria Theresa thaler. Later, additional ports were built, and universities were opened. In his first year in power, Qaboos also abolished slavery in Oman.

The political system which Qaboos established is that of an absolute monarchy. The Sultan's birthday, 18 November, is celebrated as Oman's national holiday. The first day of his reign, 23 July, is celebrated as Renaissance Day.

Oman has no system of checks and balances, and thus no separation of powers. All power was concentrated in the Sultan during his reign, and he served as chief of staff of the armed forces, minister of defence, minister of foreign affairs and chairman of the Central Bank. All legislation since 1970 has been promulgated through royal decrees, including the 1996 Basic Law. The sultan appoints judges, and can grant pardons and commute sentences. The sultan's authority is inviolable.

Qaboos' closest advisors were reportedly security and intelligence professionals within the Palace Office, headed by General Sultan bin Mohammed al Numani.

2011 Omani protests

The 2011 Omani protests were a series of protests in the Persian Gulf country of Oman that occurred as part of the revolutionary wave popularly known as the "Arab Spring". The protesters demanded salary increases, lower living costs, the creation of more jobs and a reduction in corruption. Protests in Sohar, Oman's fifth-largest city, centered on the Globe Roundabout. The Sultan's responses included the dismissal of a third of the governing cabinet.

According to CBS News, 19 June 2011, Several protest leaders have been detained and released in rolling waves of arrests during the Arab Spring, and dissatisfaction with the state of affairs in the country is high. While disgruntlement amongst the populace is obvious, the extreme dearth of foreign press coverage and lack of general press freedom there leaves it unclear as to whether the protesters want the sultan to leave, or simply want their government to function better. Beyond the recent protests, there is concern about succession in the country, as there is no heir apparent or any clear legislation on who may be the next Sultan.
The Sultan did give token concession to protesters yet detained social media activists. In August 2014, The Omani writer and human rights defender Mohammed Alfazari, the founder and editor-in-chief of the e-magazine Mowatin "Citizen", disappeared after going to the police station in the Al-Qurum district of Muscat, only to be pardoned some time later.

Foreign policy

Under Qaboos, Oman fostered closer ties with Iran than other Arab states of the Persian Gulf, and was careful to appear neutral and maintain a balance between the West and Iran. As a result, Oman often acted as an intermediary between the United States and Iran. Qaboos helped mediate secret US-Iran talks in 2013 that led two years later to the international nuclear pact, from which the United States withdrew in 2018.

In 2011, Qaboos facilitated the release of American hikers who were held by Iran, paying $1 million for their freedom.

Oman did not join the Saudi Arabian-led intervention in Yemen against the Houthis in 2015, and did not take sides in a Persian Gulf dispute that saw Saudi Arabia and its allies impose an embargo on Qatar in 2017.

In October 2018, Qaboos invited Prime Minister of Israel Benjamin Netanyahu to visit Oman, a country that does not have official diplomatic ties with Israel. Netanyahu was the first Israeli prime minister to visit Oman since Shimon Peres in 1996.

Philanthropy
Qaboos financed the construction or maintenance of a number of mosques, notably the Sultan Qaboos Grand Mosque, as well as the holy places of other religions. 

Through a donation to UNESCO in the early 1990s, Qaboos funded the Sultan Qaboos Prize for Environmental Preservation, to afford recognition to outstanding contributions in the management or preservation of the environment. The prize has been awarded biannually since 1991.

Personal life
Qaboos was a Muslim of the Ibadi denomination, which has traditionally ruled Oman. Although Oman is predominantly Muslim, the Sultan granted freedom of religion in the country and financed the construction of four Catholic and Protestant churches in the country as well as several Hindu temples.

The Sultan was an avid fan and promoter of classical music. His 120-member orchestra consists entirely of young Omanis who, since 1986, audition as children and grow up as members of the symphonic ensemble. They play locally and traveled abroad with the Sultan. Argentine composer Lalo Schifrin was commissioned to compose a work entitled Symphonic Impressions of Oman. Qaboos was particularly enthusiastic about the pipe organ. The Royal Opera House Muscat features the second largest mobile pipe organ in the world, which has three specially made organ stops, named the "Royal Solo" in his honour. He was also a patron of local folk musician Salim Rashid Suri, whom he made a cultural consultant.

On 22 March 1976, Qaboos married his first cousin Kamila (née Sayyida) Nawwal bint Tariq Al Said (born 1951), the daughter of his uncle Sayyid Tariq bin Taimur Al Said and Sayyida Shawana bint Nasir Al Busaidi. Nawwal is a half-sister of Qaboos' successor, Haitham bin Tariq. The marriage ended in divorce in 1979. The marriage produced no children.

In September 1995, Qaboos was involved in a car accident in Salalah just outside his palace, which killed one of his most prominent and influential ministers, the deputy prime minister for finance and economy, Qais Bin Abdul Munim Al Zawawi.

Qaboos owned several yachts administered by the Oman Royal Yacht Squadron, including Al Said and Fulk Al Salamah, two of the world's largest yachts.

Qaboos was widely believed by Omanis and Gulf Arabs to be homosexual. This belief was supported by Tony Molesworth, Oman's former second-most-senior intelligence officer. Qaboos' obituary in The Times described rumours throughout his life of "liaisons with elegant young European men".

Illness and death
From 2014, Qaboos suffered from colon cancer, for which he received treatment.  On 14 December 2019, he was reported to be terminal with a short time to live after his stay for medical treatment in UZ Leuven in Belgium and returned home because he wanted to die in his own country. He died on 10 January 2020 at the age of 79 at his personal residence, Bait Al-Baraka, just outside Muscat. The following day, the government declared three days of national mourning and said the country's flag would be flown at half-staff for a period of 40 days and the halt of official work in the public and private sectors for three days. Kuwait, Saudi Arabia, Qatar, United Arab Emirates, Bahrain, Lebanon, and Egypt all declared three days of mourning; India and Bangladesh declared one day of mourning. The United Kingdom lowered flags to half-mast as a sign of respect.

Succession
Unlike the heads of other Arab states of the Persian Gulf, Qaboos did not publicly name an heir. Article 6 of the constitution says the Royal Family Council has three days to choose a new sultan from the date the position falls vacant. If the Royal Family Council fails to agree, a letter containing a name penned by Sultan Qaboos should be opened in the presence of the Defence Council of military and security officials, supreme court chiefs, and heads of the upper and lower houses of the consultative assemblies. Analysts saw the rules as an elaborate means of Qaboos securing his choice for successor without causing controversy by making it public during his lifetime, since it was considered unlikely that the royal family would be able to agree on a successor on its own.

Qaboos had no children, and only one sister, Sayyida Umaima, but no male siblings; there are other male members of the Omani royal family including paternal uncles and their families. Using same-generation primogeniture, the successor to Qaboos would appear to be the children of his late uncle Sayyid Tariq bin Taimur, Oman's first prime minister and the Sultan's former father-in-law. Oman watchers believed the top contenders to succeed Qaboos were three of Tariq's sons: Asa'ad bin Tariq, Deputy Prime Minister for International Relations and Cooperation and the Sultan's special representative; Shihab bin Tariq, a retired commander of the Royal Navy of Oman; and Haitham bin Tariq, Minister of Heritage and National Culture.

On 11 January 2020, Oman state TV said the Royal Family Council, in a letter to the Defense Council, had decided to defer to the choice that Qaboos named in his will, and thus had opened the letter by Qaboos naming his successor, announcing shortly that Haitham bin Tariq is the country's ruling sultan. Haitham has two sons and two daughters.

Awards and decorations

National honours
 :
  Grand Master of the Order of Al-Said
  Grand Master of the Order of Oman
  Grand Master of the Order of the Renaissance of Oman
  Grand Master of the Order of Merit of Sultan Qaboos
  Grand Master of the Order of N'Oman
  Grand Master of the Order of Merit
  Grand Master of the Order of Sultan Qaboos
  Grand Master of the Sultan Qaboos Order for Culture, Science and Art
  Grand Master of the Order of Appreciation
  Grand Master of the Order of Achievement

Foreign honours
 :
  Grand Star of the Decoration of Honour for Services to the Republic of Austria (31 March 2001) 
 :
  Member 1st Class of the Order of Al Khalifa
 :
  Member of the Royal Family Order of the Crown of Brunei (15 December 1984)
 :
  Grand Collar of the Order of the Nile (1976)
 :
  Grand Cross of the Legion of Honour (31 May 1989)
 :
  Grand Cross Special Class of the Order of Merit of the Federal Republic of Germany
 :
  Jawaharlal Nehru Award for International Understanding (2004 – award yet to be presented) 
Gandhi Peace Prize (03/2021), Delhi
 :
  Recipient of the Star of the Republic of Indonesia, 1st Class or Adipurna
  Iran:
  Grand Collar of the Order of Pahlavi (3 March 1974)
  Recipient of the Commemorative Medal of the 2500th Anniversary of the founding of the Persian Empire (14 October 1971)
 :
  Knight Grand Cross with Collar of the Order of Merit of the Italian Republic (22 April 1974)
 :
  Grand Cordon of the Order of the Chrysanthemum
 :
  Collar of the Order of al-Hussein bin Ali
 :
  Collar of the Order of Mubarak the Great (28 December 2009)
 :
  Collar of the Order of Merit
 :
  Honorary Recipient of the Order of the Crown of the Realm (DMN) (1991)
 :
  Grand Cross of the Order of Ouissam Alaouite
  Collar of the Order of the Throne
 :
  Knight Grand Cross of the Order of the Netherlands Lion (2012)
 :
  Recipient of the Nishan-e-Pakistan, 1st Class
 :
  Collar of the Order of the Independence
 :
  Collar of the Order of Abdulaziz al Saud (23 December 2006)
  Decoration 1st Class of the Order of Abdulaziz al Saud (23 December 2006)
  Recipient of the Badr Chain
 :
  Member 1st Class of the Order of Temasek (12 March 2009)
 :
  Grand Cross of the Order of Good Hope (1999)
 :
  Knight of the Collar of the Order of Isabella the Catholic (13 December 1985)
  Grand Cross of the Order of Civil Merit
 :
  Collar of the Order of Umayyad
 :
  Grand Cordon of the Order of the Republic
  Collar of the Order of Independence
 :
  Collar of the Order of the Federation
 :
  Honorary Knight Grand Cross of the Order of the Bath (GCB) (18 March 1982)
  Honorary Knight Grand Cross of the Order of St Michael and St George (GCMG) (8 July 1976)
  Recipient of the Royal Victorian Chain (27 November 2010)
  Honorary Knight Grand Cross of the Royal Victorian Order (GCVO) (28 February 1979)
  Associate Bailiff Grand Cross of the Venerable Order of Saint John (GCStJ) (19 March 1984)
  Associate Knight of Justice of the Venerable Order of Saint John (KStJ) (8 November 1976)

Legacy
A collectible Euro note was issued in Qaboos' memory. In June 2022, his Service Medal of the Order of St John was ceremonially consecrated in London.

Palace

See also

 List of longest-reigning monarchs
 Royal Guard of Oman

References

External links
 General Assembly Pays Tribute to Qaboos bin Said, Late Sultan of Oman(Archived version)
 Statement by President George W. Bush on the Sultan of Oman(Archived version) 
 Official account of the Sultan's reign
 Oman Net
 Oman-Qaboos

1940 births
2020 deaths
Al Said dynasty
Amateur radio people
Bailiffs Grand Cross of the Order of St John
Cameronians officers
Collars of the Order of Isabella the Catholic
Deaths from cancer in Oman
Deaths from colorectal cancer
Graduates of the Royal Military Academy Sandhurst
Grand Cordons of the Order of Merit (Lebanon)
Grand Croix of the Légion d'honneur
Grand Crosses Special Class of the Order of Merit of the Federal Republic of Germany
Honorary Knights Grand Cross of the Order of St Michael and St George
Honorary Knights Grand Cross of the Order of the Bath
Honorary Knights Grand Cross of the Royal Victorian Order
Knights Grand Cross with Collar of the Order of Merit of the Italian Republic
Leaders who took power by coup
Marshals of the air force
Omani Ibadi Muslims
People from Salalah
Recipients of the Darjah Utama Temasek
Recipients of the Grand Star of the Decoration for Services to the Republic of Austria
Sons of Omani sultans
Sultans of Oman
20th-century Omani people